Edward Harold Lindquist (born February 14, 1938) is a former American politician who was a member of the Oregon House of Representatives. He was a firefighter.

References

1938 births
Living people
Democratic Party members of the Oregon House of Representatives
Politicians from Portland, Oregon
Politicians from Oregon City, Oregon
American firefighters